= Pandit Sham Sundar Narain Tankha =

Indian politician (14 August 1898 - 8 May 1985)

Member of Parliament, Rajya Sabha
- In office 1952-1970
- Constituency: Uttar Pradesh

Personal details
- Born: August 14, 1898
- Died: May 8, 1985 (aged 86)
- Party: Indian National Congress
- Spouse: Bishan Topa

Pandit Sham Sundar Narain Tankha was an Indian politician. He was a Member of Parliament, representing Uttar Pradesh in the Rajya Sabha the upper house of India's Parliament as a member of the Indian National Congress.
